A pink lake is a lake that has a red or pink colour.  This is often caused by the presence of salt-tolerant algae that produces carotenoids, such as Dunaliella salina, usually in conjunction with specific bacteria, which may vary from lake to lake.The most common archea is Halobacterium salinarum.

Causes
Pink lakes arise from a combination of factors, which include climate and hydrology of the continent beneath them, in particular the level of salinity. The orange/pink colour of salt lakes across the world has often been attributed to the green alga Dunaliella salina, but other work has shown that bacteria or archaea are also involved.

Alga

Dunaliella salina is the most halophilic (salt-tolerant) alga known and can grow in salinity as high as 35% NaCl (in comparison to seawater, which contains approximately 3% NaCl). The single-celled green alga plays a key role in primary production in hypersaline environments around the world. At high salinity, temperature and light, this alga accumulates the red carotenoid pigment, beta-carotene. This is the same pigment that gives carrots, which contain 0.3% of beta-carotene, their colour. D. salina can adapt to a very wide range of concentrations of salt. The beta-carotene protects the alga against damage from high light, coating the green chlorophyll and giving the alga an orange/red colour. The alga, which was found not to contain a high intracellular concentration, was named after Michel Félix Dunal who first recognised the red colour of certain salt lakes in France was due to an organism.

It was thought for a long time that the colour of pink lakes was the result of this alga, as it has been found in many pink lakes.

Bacteria/archaea
Some bacteria and archaea also produce a carotenoid pigment within their cell membranes, which may either contribute to or be the only cause of the pink colouration.

In some of the hundreds of Australian pink lakes, a red bacterium, Salinibacter ruber, may be involved in producing their colour. Work done by molecular biologist Ken McGrath at on Lake Hillier, on Middle Island in Western Australia led by molecular biologist Ken McGrath in 2015 showed that, while D. salina was present in only tiny quantities (0.1% of DNA sampled), while S. ruber formed 20 to 33% of the DNA recovered from the lake. They found 10 species of halophilic bacteria and archaea as well as several species of Dunaliella algae, nearly all of which contain some pink, red or salmon-coloured pigment.

Environmental scientist Tilo Massenbauer, while researching the loss of colour of the lake since the 1990s (attributed to excessive salt harvesting from it), has a hunch that  all pink lakes are caused by S. ruber, rather than D. salina, but proving this is challenging, because bacteria are so much smaller and more difficult to find than algae. A project is being planned to pump more salt into the lake from local agricultural land, where high salinity is a problem. Lake Retba in Senegal, in West Africa, contains the same bacterium.

S. ruber produces a pigment called bacterioruberin, which helps it to trap and use light for energy in the photosynthesis process. While the pigments in algae are contained within the chloroplasts, bacterioruberin is spread across the whole cell of the bacterium. This makes it more likely that the colour of the lake is that of S. ruber.

The archaea Halobacterium salinarum (formerly Halobacterium cutirubrum), which is pink in colour and generally grows within the salt crust on the bottom of the lake, has been found to be involved in the colour of some pink lakes, such as the lake in Melbourne's Westgate Park.  The exact colour of the lake depends on the balance between D. salina and H. salinarium, with salt concentration having a direct impact.

Characteristics
The majority of pink salt lakes change their colour which is often linked to rainfall. A lake in Westgate Park, Melbourne, Australia, was coloured pink in March 2017 and then again in September 2019, but since then and  had taken on a dark green hue. Warmer weather and lower rainfall appears to make it turn pink. As water evaporates, the  salinity increases, but salinity is not the only factor at work. Sediment and the organisms living in the lake affect its colour, and the shade of pink that it takes on.

Pink lakes such as Lake Hillier can be up to ten times saltier than seawater (the Dead Sea in Israel is around nine times so). It is safe to swim in pink lakes, but it is not advisable to drink it owing to the effect of its hypersalinity on the human body, and the possibility of micro-organisms which may be harmful to human health.

Examples

Africa
 Kleinzee Yacht Club in Kleinzee, Northern Cape, South Africa
 Lake Natron near Mount Kilimanjaro, Tanzania
 Lake Retba or Lac Rose, in Senegal

Americas
 Dusty Rose Lake in British Columbia, Canada
 Laguna Colorada, Bolivia
 On the Yucatán Peninsula, Mexico

Asia

 Aralsor, Kazakhstan
 Koyashskoye Salt Lake, on the southern coast of Kerch Peninsula, Crimea
  Lipar Pink Wetland in the Chabahar, Sistan, Iran
 Lonar Lake in Maharashtra, India
 Masazirgol (Masazir Lake), near Baku, Azerbaijan
 Maharloo Lake near Shiraz, Iran

Australasia
 Champagne Pool, Waiotapu thermal region, New Zealand
 Hutt Lagoon in midwest Western Australia, covering 
 Lake Bumbunga near Lochiel, South Australia
 Lake Grassmere, near Marlborough, New Zealand
 Lake Hillier in the Recherche Archipelago, Western Australia
 Pink Lake (Western Australia) near Esperance
Pink Lake (Quairading), at Badjaling, near Quairading, WA
 Pink Lake (Victoria) in the Murray-Sunset National Park, in the state of Victoria, Australia

Europe
 Las Salinas de Torrevieja, near Torrevieja in Alicante province, Spain
 Lake Lemuria, in the Kherson region of Ukraine
 Les Salins d'Aigues-Mortes, in the Camargue in France
 Pačir lake, Bačka Palanka, Serbia

Footnotes

References

External links
 Video of Lake Hllier.
 

Lakes by type